Ioannis Polemis (1862 – 28 May 1924) was a Greek poet.

Life and career
Born in Athens, Polemis came from a historical Byzantine family. When he was in his twenties, some works of his were published in a Greek magazine. Soon, his poems and articles were published in Greek newspapers and magazines. It is believed that he was influenced by Kostis Palamas, a famous Greek poet. In 1918, Polemis took a reward for the contributions of his work. He died in 1924 in Athens due to pneumonia.

References

External links

1860 births
1924 deaths
Writers from Athens
Modern Greek poets
New Athenian School
19th-century Greek poets